Tollius is a surname. Notable people with the surname include:

Bartha Hermina Tollius (1780–1847), amateur Dutch pastellist
Cornelius Tollius ( 1628–1654), Dutch scholar
Herman Tollius (1742–1822), Dutch philologist and historian
Jacobus Tollius (1633–1696), Dutch classicist